
Gmina Trzemeszno is an urban-rural gmina (administrative district) in Gniezno County, Greater Poland Voivodeship, in west-central Poland.

Villages
Apart from the town of Trzemeszno, Gmina Trzemeszno contains the villages and settlements of Bieślin, Brzozowiec, Bystrzyca, Cytrynowo, Dąbrowa, Duszno, Dysiek, Folusz, Gołąbki, Grabowo, Huta Trzemeszeńska, Ignalin, Jastrzębowo, Jerzykowo, Kamieniec, Kierzkowo, Kozłówko, Kozłowo, Kruchowo, Kurze Grzędy, Ławki, Lubiń, Miaty, Mijanowo, Miława, Niewolno, Ochodza, Ostrowite, Pasieka, Płaczkowo, Popielewo, Powiadacze, Rudki, Smolary, Święte, Szydłowo, Szydłowo Drugie, Trzemżal, Wydartowo, Wymysłowo and Zieleń.

Neighbouring gminas
Gmina Trzemeszno is bordered by the gminas of Gniezno, Mogilno, Orchowo, Rogowo and Witkowo.

References
Polish official population figures 2006

Trzemeszno
Gniezno County